Caleb Homesley (born November 27, 1996) is an American basketball player for Zenit Saint Petersburg of the VTB United League. He played college basketball for the Liberty Flames. He is currently participating in the NBA Summer League with the Utah Jazz.

Early life and high school career
Homesley attended  Porter Ridge High School in Indian Trail, North Carolina. He averaged 20 points, 5 rebounds, and 3 assists per game as a junior. On November 14, 2014, Homesley committed to Liberty, spurning offers from The Citadel, Appalachian State, Abilene Christian, Gardner-Webb, High Point, Kent State, and UNC Greensboro. In his senior season, he tore his anterior cruciate ligament.

College career
Shortly after Homesley arrived at Liberty University, coach Ritchie McKay suggested he transfer to a Division II school. This served to motivate Homesley, who began working harder and getting in shape. In his freshman season, he played 32 games, averaging 7.2 points and 3.4 rebounds per game. Homesley tore the ligament in his right knee during a game against Princeton on December 10, 2016, ending his season. He was averaging 12.9 points, 6.3 rebounds, and 2.9 assists per games. Homesley took a medical redshirt, preserving a season of eligibility. In his redshirt sophomore season, Homesley averaged 7.8 points, 4.5 rebounds, and 1.9 assists per game. As a junior, Homesley was named to the First Team All-ASUN Conference. During the 2019 NCAA Division I men's basketball tournament, Homesley scored a career-high 30 points on 10-for-16 shooting in a 80–76 upset of Mississippi State. He averaged 12.9 points, 5.6 rebounds, and 2.7 assists per game as a junior on a team that finished 29–7. Coming into his senior season, Homesley was included on the preseason watch list for the Lou Henson Award, presented annually to the nation's top mid-major player. On February 8, 2020, Homesley tied a career-high 30 points and had nine rebounds in a 74–56 win over North Alabama. At the conclusion of the regular season, Homesley was named the Atlantic Sun Player of the Year. Homesly averaged 15.3 points and 5.7 rebounds per game as a senior.

Professional career
After going undrafted in the 2020 NBA draft, Homesley signed an Exhibit 10 contract with the Washington Wizards. He was waived at the end of training camp. 

On January 9, 2021, he signed with the Erie BayHawks as a flex player after Washington's affiliate, the Capital City Go-Go, declined to play the NBA G League restart. in 15 games, he averaged 9.3 points, 4.1 rebounds and 2.3 assists.

On May 15, 2021, Homesley signed a multi-year contract with the Wizards. However, he was waived on August 5, without appearing in a game. 

On September 1, he signed with the Hamburg Towers of the Basketball Bundesliga.

On July 15, 2022, he has signed with Zenit Saint Petersburg of the VTB United League.

References

External links
Liberty Flames bio

1996 births
Living people
African-American basketball players
American men's basketball players
Basketball players from North Carolina
Erie BayHawks (2019–2021) players
Hamburg Towers players
Liberty Flames basketball players
People from Union County, North Carolina
Shooting guards